Johann Christian Ludwig Hellwig (8 November 1743, in Garz/Rügen – 10 October 1831, in Braunschweig) was a German mathematician, entomologist and wargame designer.

Biography
After studies of mathematics and natural history at the university of Frankfurt, he became, in 1766, adviser to prince Wilhelm Adolf von Braunschweig at the time of his voyage in the south of Russia.

In 1771, he was appointed teacher of mathematics and natural sciences in two colleges of Brunswick and in 1790 he was appointed to teach mathematics and natural sciences at the Collegium Carolinum in Braunschweig, becoming full professor in 1802. He taught mathematics when the College Carolinum was converted to the military academy of Braunschweig. Teaching military sciences inspired his work on wargames. 

A number of his students became significant mathematicians:  Conrad Diedrich Stahl, professor in Jena, then in Landshut and later in Munich, Karl Bartels, state councilor and professor in Dorpat, Brandan Mollweide in Leipzig, the astronomer AH Chr. Gelpcke in Braunschweig, Fr. Wilh. Spehr in Brunswick, Karl Graeffe in Zurich and K. Fr. Gaussin

He was the tutor and the father-in-law of the German entomologist Johann Karl Wilhelm Illiger (1775–1813), who became director of the zoological garden of Berlin, of the mineralogist Gottlieb Peter Sillem (who succeeded him at the school of Braunschweig) and the count Johann Centurius Hoffmannsegg (1766–1849). At his death he had served the state of Brunswick for 60 years and the ducal family for 65 years.

He founded the Brunswick general widows’ fund, now a general life insurance institution, and was responsible for the calculations ensuring its viability.

He worked in the taxonomy of the insects in collaboration with Illiger and Hoffmannsegg, and his insect colllection, together with theirs, was the origin of the insect collection of the University of Berlin.

Hellwig's Wargame 

Hellwig was also the inventor of kriegsspiel (literally war game), a sophisticated variant of chess which had much success in its time. Hellwig published the first edition of his kriegsspiel in 1780 as Versuch eines aufs Schachspiel gebaueten taktischen Spiels von zwey und mehreren Personen zu spielen, or "Attempt to build upon chess a tactical game which two or more persons might play." His objective was to try to create a chess-like game that better reflected the military science of the day, especially the behavior of infantry, cavalry and artillery. 

His initial kriegsspiel vastly expanded the chess board (he usually employed a board of 49 ranks by 33 files, for 1617 squares) and radically changed the behavior of pieces, as well as introducing several new pieces. Rather than depicting only the abstract space of chess, his board had varying terrain types, including mountains, swamps and water squares. Rather than capturing the king to win, one had to occupy an enemy fortress. 

Hellwig further refined his game over the next twenty years, publishing in 1803 his revised Das Kriegsspiel, which dispensed with the trappings of chess entirely and substituted for chess pieces new units representing the military branches of his era. His game spawned numerous contemporary imitators, and its fundamental innovations influenced Reisswitz Sr. and Jr.'s games (1810s and 20s), and eventually formed the basis of the hobby board wargames pioneered by Avalon Hill in the twentieth century.

Some related publications

Further reading

References

External links 
 Literatur von und über Johann Christian Ludwig Hellwig beim BSZ
 Eintrag in der ADB

1743 births
1831 deaths
People from Garz (Rügen)
German entomologists
Academic staff of the Technical University of Braunschweig
German mineralogists